is a Japanese cinematographer and photographer.

Career
Starting in 8mm film and pink film, Ashizawa eventually became an assistant to the cinematographers Hideo Itō and Takayo Oshikiri. She turned independent in 1982 and has photographed the films of directors such as Kiyoshi Kurosawa, Kunitoshi Manda, and Shō Igarashi, in addition to doing the camera for TV commercials and documentaries. She has also published several collections of her photographs.

Awards
In 2012, she won the award for best cinematography for Chronicle of My Mother at the Mainichi Film Awards. In 2018, she was awarded the Medal with Purple Ribbon by the Japanese government.

Filmography
 Naked Blood (1996)
 Unloved (2001)
 Loft (2005)
 Retribution (2006)
 Tokyo Sonata (2008)
 Kyōfu (2010)
 Chronicle of My Mother (2011)
 Real (2013)
 Tamako in Moratorium (2013)
 Journey to the Shore (2015)
 Sayonara (2015)
 Creepy (2016)
 Before We Vanish (2017)
 To the Ends of the Earth (2019)
 Vengeance Is Mine, All Others Pay Cash (2021)

Notes

External links

"What's in Your Kit: Akiko Ashizawa", MovieMaker

Living people
Japanese cinematographers
1951 births
Japanese women cinematographers
Recipients of the Medal with Purple Ribbon